Proroblemma is a genus of moths of the family Erebidae. The genus was erected by George Hampson in 1910.

Taxonomy
The genus has previously been classified in the subfamily Eublemminae within Erebidae or in the subfamily Acontiinae of the family Noctuidae.

Species
 Proroblemma cupreispila Dyar, 1914
 Proroblemma philogonia Dyar, 1914
 Proroblemma polystriga Hampson, 1910
 Proroblemma porphyrea Dyar, 1914
 Proroblemma rosea Schaus, 1911
 Proroblemma stictopteris Butler, 1881
 Proroblemma testa Barnes & McDunnough, 1913

References

Boletobiinae
Noctuoidea genera